Eduardo Francisco Cote Lamus (16 August 1928 – 3 August 1964) was a Colombian lawyer, poet and politician.

Personal life
Colombian poet and politician born on 16 August 1928 in Cúcuta, North Santander; the youngest of three. His parents were Pablo Antonio Cote Bautista and Emma Lamus Hernández, his other two older siblings were Elena and José Guillermo. He married Alicia Baraibar in 1958, a Spaniard and daughter of Germán Baraibar Usandizaga, the Ambassador of Spain in Colombia. He had three children with his wife, Pedro, Elena, and Ramón.

References

1928 births
1964 deaths
People from Cúcuta
Road incident deaths in Colombia
Universidad Externado de Colombia alumni
20th-century Colombian poets
Colombian male poets
Members of the Chamber of Representatives of Colombia
Members of the Senate of Colombia
Governors of Norte de Santander Department
20th-century Colombian lawyers
University of Salamanca alumni
20th-century male writers